Arthur Treacher's Fish & Chips is an American fast food seafood restaurant and former chain. At the peak of its popularity in the late 1970s, it had more than 800 stores. However, as of June 2021, there are only two stand-alone Arthur Treacher's location remaining.  The menu offers fried seafood or chicken, accompanied by chips (French fries).

History

Namesake 

The chain's namesake is Arthur Treacher (1894–1975), an English character actor typecast as "the perfect butler" for his performances as Jeeves, as a butler in several Shirley Temple films, and the role of Constable Jones in Walt Disney Productions' Mary Poppins. At the time the chain was founded, Treacher was best known as the announcer and sidekick on the popular The Merv Griffin Show. Treacher refused in interviews to confirm whether he had a financial involvement in the restaurants. Regardless, he "served as a spokesman for the restaurant chain in its early years, underscoring the British character of its food." He would sometimes visit the restaurants in a red double-decker bus. In a 1975 interview, New England franchise vice president M. John Elliott claimed the fish recipe to be the actor's own, brought over from the United Kingdom.

National Fast Food Corp. 

The franchise company was started in Columbus, Ohio in 1969 as National Fast Food Corp.  Its principals at the time included S. Robert Davis, his friend and future Wendy's founder Dave Thomas, and L. S. Hartzog. 

Davis was a real estate developer who built and leased several Colonel Sanders Kentucky Fried Chicken properties. Thomas sold his Colonel Sanders franchises back to that company for $3 million. Hartzog ran a chain of bakeries selling biscuits to Colonel Sanders franchisees nationally.

Fisher Foods 

In 1970, Fisher Foods swapped capital with and licensed franchises from National, with a total of 550 franchises sold (106 to Fisher alone), but only 99 stores were actually in operation. Long John Silver's, Captain D's, Skipper's and Alfie's Fish & Chips likewise employed the fish franchise concept about the same time.  Aided by Arthur Treacher's advertisements, these companies introduced British fish and chips to northeastern America, albeit four years after Salt's Fish & Chips (later renamed H. Salt, Esq. Authentic English Fish and Chips) introduced British fish and chips to America in California.

Orange Co. 

By the early 1970s, National Fast Food had become Orange Co. Under this name, Davis conducted an aggressive expansion campaign from 1972 through 1976. Lacking equity, he relied on generous sale-leaseback agreements. Under the terms of these agreements, Orange Co. would sell to investors sites for new restaurants and then sign long leases unconditionally guaranteeing to continue lease payments if the restaurants failed.

Mrs. Paul's Seafood 

On November 21, 1979, Orange Co. sold Arthur Treacher's to Mrs. Paul's. However, under the terms of its original sale-leaseback agreements, Orange Co. remained liable for millions of dollars of payments to investors.

The "Cod Wars" between the United Kingdom and Iceland during the 1970s caused cod prices to double. Mrs. Paul's responded by replacing the Icelandic cod in Arthur Treacher's recipe with less expensive pollock. The move exacerbated tensions with franchisees – some of whom had already withheld a total of $5 million in royalties for what they perceived to be a steadily declining level of service. Litigation arising from the conflict eventually reached the United States Court of Appeals for the Third Circuit.

Lumara Foods 

After losing the case to the franchisees and having no way to compensate them, Mrs. Paul's sold Arthur Treacher's to Lumara Foods of America Inc. in March 1982. Lumara Foods filed for reorganization under Chapter 11 of the U.S. Bankruptcy Code four months later.

Investment group 

The company was subsequently bought by a group of investors and the corporate offices were relocated to Youngstown, Ohio. It went into bankruptcy in 1983. Two years later, it was merged into a shell company by Jim Cataland.

From 1985 to 1993, Cataland slowly expanded the company again. In 1993, money from a new group of investors was used to introduce a more modern seafood concept; to buy additional stores; and to move the company from its base operations in Youngstown, Ohio, to Jacksonville, Florida.

In the mid-1980s, franchises in Detroit, Michigan were converted by their owner to a new chain called Seafood Bay. Arthur Treacher's purchased six Seafood Bay locations back in 1997, but was unsuccessful in reverting them.

The company experimented with co-branding, forming an alliance with Arby's (which got its start in the Youngstown suburb of Boardman) for co-branded locations. One such location existed in Breezewood, Pennsylvania. However, by the late 1990s, Arby's parent Triarc removed the Arthur Treacher's portions of its co-branded Arby's.

PAT Franchise Systems 

In 2002, the company holding the Arthur Treacher's trademark was acquired by PAT Franchise Systems, a wholly owned subsidiary of TruFoods Systems. In 2006, Nathan's Famous bought the exclusive rights to market the Arthur Treacher's trademark and sell their products co-branded with Nathan's Own concepts Kenny Rogers Roasters and Miami Subs. However, PAT Franchise Systems retained a license agreement entitling it to sell Arthur Treacher's Fish and Chips franchises in eight states.

Nathan's Famous 

In 2021, Nathan's Famous announced plans to offer Arthur Treacher's branded food nationwide as a ghost kitchen concept only available via food delivery services. Senior Vice President of Restaurants James Walker said, "We think it’s a nice combination of historic, storied brand, with new focus on the food.”

First of two remaining stand-alone location 

The first of two remaining free-standing Arthur Treacher's restaurant is located at 1833 State Road in Cuyahoga Falls, Ohio. It has been owned by franchisee Ben Vittoria since the late 1980s. He credits customer loyalty to the brand to “the taste of a unique product, and memories of happier and less complicated times.” In recognition of the restaurant's  survival, Cuyahoga Falls Mayor Don Walters designated June 30, 2021, as Arthur Treacher's Day.

Last remaining attached franchise locations and one more reopens 
In addition to the last remaining stand-alone Arthur Treacher's restaurant in Cuyahoga Falls, Ohio, several Salvatore's Pizzerias in Rochester, New York have attached Arthur Treacher's franchises still in operation. The Twin Oaks Convenience Store at 34099 State Rt. 7 in Pomeroy, Ohio also maintains an attached Arthur Treacher's franchise location, sharing kitchen space with a Hunt Brothers Pizza and a Sub Express.  In February 2023 a store reopened in Garfield Heights, Ohio just in time for the Lenten season.

See also

 List of fish and chip restaurants
 List of seafood restaurants

References

External links 
 
 

Fast-food seafood restaurants
Fish and chip restaurants
Seafood restaurants in the United States
Regional restaurant chains in the United States
Fast-food chains of the United States
Restaurants established in 1969
Companies based in Jacksonville, Florida
Companies that filed for Chapter 11 bankruptcy in 1982
Companies that filed for Chapter 11 bankruptcy in 1983
1969 establishments in Ohio
1979 mergers and acquisitions